Busan Kyungsang College is a college in the Yeonje-gu district of Busan Metropolitan City, in southeastern South Korea. It has a legal maximum enrollment of 3,700 students.

Academic departments
The college offers training in technical and business-related fields. According to the school, the Department of Mobile Games is the only mobile game department in South Korea.

History
The school opened its doors on March 8, 1980. The Hwashin School Foundation, which founded it, was established in 1977. The current President, Park Seok-Yong, was installed in 2001.

Notable alumni
 Bae Ki-sung, singer (Can)
 Song Kang-ho, actor

See also
 List of colleges and universities in South Korea
 Education in South Korea

External links
 Official school website, in English
 Official school website, in Korean

Universities and colleges in Busan
Educational institutions established in 1980
1980 establishments in South Korea